This is a list of genera in the mushroom-forming fungus family Agaricaceae.

Genera

See also 
 List of Agaricales families
 List of Agaricales genera

References
Notes

References

Cited texts 

Agaricaceae